Frassine is a village in Tuscany, central Italy. It is administratively a frazione of the comune of Monterotondo Marittimo, province of Grosseto, in the area of Colline Metallifere. At the time of the 2001 census its population amounted to 26.

Frassine is about 68 km from Grosseto and 10 km from Monterotondo Marittimo, and it is situated along the Provincial Road which links Monterotondo with Suvereto and Campiglia Marittima.

The town's name derives from the frequent occurrence of ash trees (Latin fraxinus, Italian frassino).

Main sights 
 Sanctuary of Madonna del Frassine (16th century), main church of the village, it contains a sculpture of Mary brought from Africa by saint Cerbonius and saint Regulus
 San Regolo in Gualdo, now in ruins
 Bagno del Re (King's Bath), ancient building of 10th century, it's now in ruins

See also 
 Boracifero Lake
 Lago Boracifero, Monterotondo Marittimo
 Monterotondo Marittimo

References

Bibliography 
 Aldo Mazzolai, Guida della Maremma. Percorsi tra arte e natura, Le Lettere, Florence, 1997.

External links
 

Frazioni of Monterotondo Marittimo